2013 Regional League Division 2  Central & Western Region is the 1st season of the League competition since its establishment in 2013. It is in the third tier of the Thai football league system.

Changes from last season

Team changes

Promoted clubs
No club was promoted

Relegated clubs from 2012 Yamaha League-1
Raj Pracha relegated from the 2012 Yamaha League-1.

Relocated clubs

Ang Thong, Muangkan, Phetchaburi, Prachuap Khiri Khan, Looktabfah F.C.  re-located to the Regional League Central-West Division from the Central & Eastern Division 2012.
Singburi  re-located to the Regional League Central-West Division from the Northern Division 2012.
Globlex, Krung Thonburi, Thonburi BG United, Samut Sakhon re-located to the Regional League Central-West Division from the Bangkok Area Division 2012.

Renamed clubs
 Raj Pracha renamed Raj Pracha BTU

Expansion clubs
Hua Hin City, Futera Seeker joined the newly expanded league setup.

Stadium and locations

League table

References

External links
 

2013 Regional League Division 2